"Hard to Say" is a song written by Mark Miller, and recorded by American country music group Sawyer Brown.  It was released in June 1994 as the fourth single from the album Outskirts of Town.  The song reached #5 on the Billboard Hot Country Singles & Tracks chart.

Chart performance
"Hard to Say" debuted at number 71 on the U.S. Billboard Hot Country Singles & Tracks for the week of June 25, 1994.

Year-end charts

References

1994 singles
1993 songs
Sawyer Brown songs
Songs written by Mark Miller (musician)
Music videos directed by Michael Salomon
Curb Records singles